A Question of Proof is a 1935 detective novel by Cecil Day-Lewis, written under the pen name of Nicholas Blake. It is the first in a series of novels featuring the private detective Nigel Strangeways. Day-Lewis chose to write under an assumed name as he feared writing in the popular detective genre would harm his growing reputation as a serious-minded poet. Consequently, the publishers Collins advertised the book as being written by a "well-known writer" using a pen name. It was a commercial success selling around 200,000 copies in Britain and launching Day-Lewis, who quickly did become widely identified as the author, as one of the leading writers of the Golden Age of Detective Fiction.

Synopsis
At Sudeley Hall preparatory school on sports day the body of Algernon Wyvern-Wemys, nephew of the headmaster and widely loathed throughout the school, is found dead in a haystack. When the police's suspicions fall on teacher Michael Evans who has been having an affair with the headmaster's wife, he asks his old friend from Oxford Nigel Strangeways to investigate the real culprit. He has his suspicions, but requires the necessary proof until a second murder is committed during a cricket match.

References

Bibliography
 Reilly, John M. Twentieth Century Crime & Mystery Writers. Springer, 2015.
 Stanford, Peter. C Day-Lewis: A Life. A&C Black, 2007.

1935 British novels
Novels by Cecil Day-Lewis
British crime novels
British mystery novels
Collins Crime Club books
Novels set in England
British detective novels
1935 debut novels